Kobina Tahir Hammond (born June 16, 1960)  is a Ghanaian politician. He is the Member of Parliament for Adansi-Asokwa constituency in the Ashanti Region of Ghana in the 3rd, 4th, 5th, 6th, 7th and the 8th Parliament of the 4th Ghanaian Republic. He is a member of the New Patriotic Party.

Early life and Education 
Hammond was born on June 16, 1960. He hails from Asokwa, a town in the Ashanti Region of Ghana. Hammond had his high school education at Adisadel College. He holds a Bachelor of Arts degree in Law and Political Science from the University of Ghana. He acquired the degree in 1986. He is also a product of Gray's Inn, Holborn Law School, London, UK. From there, he acquired a Bachelor of Law in 1991.

Career 
Hammond was a partner at the Chancery Chambers in London.

Political career 
Hammond is a member of the New Patriotic Party. He became a member of parliament from January 2001 after emerging winner in the Ghana General Election in December 2000. He has since then had a run of five consecutive terms in office. He is the MP for Adansi-Asokwa constituency. He has been elected as the member of parliament for this constituency in the third, fourth, fifth, sixth and seventh parliament of the fourth Republic of Ghana.  He was re-elected in the 2020 General election to represent in the 8th Parliament of the Fourth Republic of Ghana. Kobina was a member of the Finance Committee, and Mines and Energy Committee in the 7th Parliament of the 4th Republic of Ghana.

Elections 
In the year 2000, Hammond won the general elections as the member of parliament for the  Adansi-Asokwa constituency of the Ashanti Region of Ghana. He won on the ticket of the New Patriotic Party. His constituency was a part of the 31 parliamentary seats out of 33 seats won by the New Patriotic Party in that election for the Ashanti Region. The New Patriotic Party won a majority total of 99 parliamentary seats out of 200 seats. He was elected with 10,306 votes out of 19,407 total valid votes cast. This was equivalent to 54.4% of the total valid votes cast. He was elected over Theresa Mensah of the National Democratic Congress, Nana Yaw Frimpong of the People's National Convention, Kwame Amoh of the Convention People's Party, Peter Kofi Essilfie of the National Reformed Party and Prince Lawrence of the United Ghana Movement. These won 7,230, 1,001, 241, 92 and 61 votes out of the total valid votes cast respectively. These were equivalent to 38.2%, 5.3%, 1.3%, 0.5% and 0.3% respectively of total valid votes cast.

Hammond was elected as the member of parliament for the Adansi-Asokwa constituency of the Ashanti Region of Ghana for the second time in the 2004 Ghanaian general elections. He won on the ticket of the New Patriotic Party. His constituency was a part of the 36 parliamentary seats out of 39 seats won by the New Patriotic Party in that election for the Ashanti Region. The New Patriotic Party won a majority total of 128 parliamentary seats out of 230 seats. He was elected with 15,176 votes out of 24,112 total valid votes cast equivalent to 62.9% of total valid votes cast. He was elected over Seidu S. Adams of the Peoples’ National Convention and Reverend Evans Amankwa of the National Democratic Congress. These obtained 0.7% and 36.3% respectively of total valid votes cast.

In 2008, he won the general elections on the ticket of the New Patriotic Party for the same constituency. His constituency was part of the 34 parliamentary seats out of 39 seats won by the New Patriotic Party in that election for the Ashanti Region. The New Patriotic Party won a minority total of 109 parliamentary seats out of 230 seats. He was elected with 13,659 votes out of 24,524 total valid votes cast equivalent to 55.7% of total valid votes cast. He was elected over Alhaji Abdul-Lateef Madjoub of the National Democratic Congress, Amoako Anaafi of Democratic Freedom Party and Owusu-Boamah Francis of the Convention People's Party. These obtained 37.59%, 5.43% and 1.28% respectively of the total votes cast.

Personal life 
Hammond is a Muslim. He belongs to the Ahmadiya faction.  He is married.

See also
List of MPs elected in the 2000 Ghanaian parliamentary election
List of MPs elected in the 2004 Ghanaian parliamentary election
List of MPs elected in the 2008 Ghanaian parliamentary election
List of MPs elected in the 2012 Ghanaian parliamentary election
List of MPs elected in the 2016 Ghanaian parliamentary election

References

1960 births
Living people
Ghanaian Muslims
Ghanaian MPs 2001–2005
Ghanaian MPs 2005–2009
Ghanaian MPs 2009–2013
Ghanaian MPs 2013–2017
Ghanaian MPs 2017–2021
New Patriotic Party politicians
University of Ghana alumni
Ghanaian MPs 2021–2025